Carlo Adolfo Cantù (21 January 1875, Turin -1942) was an Italian composer. He studied music composition at the Turin Conservatory with Giovanni Bolzoni and is best known for his opera Ettore Fieramosca which premiered at the Teatro Regio in Turin in 1921.

Sources
La musica italiana nel Novecento by Roberto Zanetti, page 142

1875 births
1942 deaths
Italian classical composers
Italian male classical composers
Italian opera composers
Male opera composers